Glenbervie House is a mansion house, which has incorporated parts of an earlier castle, located near Glenbervie, Kincardine and Mearns, Scotland.

History
A castle existed in the 13th century, owned by the Melville family which originally controlled a number of trackways over the Mounth. King Edward I of England stayed one night in 1296 at the castle, during his invasion of Scotland on his way to Aberdeen. Alterations were undertaken in the 14th  century. The castle passed by the heiress Elizabeth Melville to the Auchinleck family in 1468 and by the heiress Elizabeth Auchinleck to the Douglas family in 1496. 

Further alterations were undertaken in the 15th century. Adam Gordon of Auchindoun laid siege to Glenbervie in 1572 and captured the castle during the Marian civil war. The castle was sold in 1675 to Robert Burnett of Leys. Further alterations were undertaken in 1700, as well as 1854.

Citations

References
CANMORE - Glenbervie House
Coventry, Martin. Castles of the Clans: the strongholds and seats of 750 Scottish families and clans. Goblinshead, 2008. 
 

Castles in Aberdeenshire
Category B listed buildings in Aberdeenshire
Listed houses in Scotland
Inventory of Gardens and Designed Landscapes